Charles Fox Hovey (1807–1859) was a businessman in Boston, Massachusetts who established C.F. Hovey and Co., a department store on Summer Street. Through the years Hovey's business partners included Washington Williams, James H. Bryden, Richard C. Greenleaf and John Chandler. The Johnson family (Fidelity Investments Edward C. Johnson II)  got their start at C.F. Hovey and Co. with Samuel Johnson Jr.   In 1947 Jordan Marsh absorbed Hovey's.

Hovey was also an abolitionist and a supporter of other social reform movements. He was one of a group of Boston businessmen who provided most of the funding for the American Anti-Slavery Society.
He also signed the call to the first National Woman's Rights Convention in 1850. Hovey left a bequest of $50,000 to support abolitionism and other types of social reform, including "women's rights, non-resistance, free trade and temperance." The bequest was used to create the Hovey Fund, which provided significant support to social reform movements of that time.  It was headed by abolitionist Wendell Phillips.

In a point of interest, the store C.F. Hovey and Co. on Summer Street was once the property of Robert Hull received a "great allotment" in 1636 and passed the property to his son John Hull of the "Hull Mint" fame. By 1680, the mint master John Hull greatly expanded his ownership on Summer Street.

References

 Abbott, Richard. Cotton and Capital: Boston Businessmen and Antislavery Reform, 1854-1868.  University of Massachusetts Press, 1991. 
 Daniel Hovey Association. The Hovey Book: describing the English ancestry and American descendants of Daniel Hovey of Ipswich, Massachusetts. Press of L.R. Hovey, 1914; p. 266+
 Dudden, Faye E. Fighting Chance: The Struggle over Woman Suffrage and Black Suffrage in Reconstruction America.  Oxford University Press, New York, 2011.

Further reading

 Tribute to the Memory of Charles F. Hovey, Boston, 1859.
 History of the House of Hovey, containing reminiscences of almost three quarters of a century. Boston: 1920.

Images

1807 births
1859 deaths
19th-century American businesspeople
19th century in Boston
American abolitionists
American feminists
American temperance activists
Businesspeople from Boston
Male feminists